Jan Bořil (born 11 January 1991) is a Czech professional footballer who currently plays for Slavia Prague in the Czech First League as a left back.

Club career
On 9 May 2018, he played as Slavia Prague won the 2017–18 Czech Cup final against Jablonec.

International
He made his debut for Czech Republic national team on 1 September 2017 in a World Cup qualifier against Germany.

Career statistics

Club

Honours
Slavia Prague
Czech First League: 2016–17, 2018–19, 2019–20
Czech Cup: 2017–18, 2018–19

References

External links 
 Profile at iDNES.cz (Czech)
 Profile at FA ČR (Czech)
 

1991 births
Living people
Czech footballers
Czech Republic youth international footballers
Czech Republic international footballers
Czech First League players
FK Mladá Boleslav players
FK Viktoria Žižkov players
SK Slavia Prague players
People from Nymburk
Association football defenders
Czech National Football League players
UEFA Euro 2020 players
Sportspeople from the Central Bohemian Region